"Under the Sea" is a song from Disney's 1989 animated film The Little Mermaid, composed by Alan Menken with lyrics by Howard Ashman. It is influenced by the calypso style of the Caribbean which originated in Trinidad and Tobago, as well as reggae, which originated in Jamaica. The song was performed in the film by Samuel E. Wright.  The track won the Academy Award for Best Original Song in 1989, the first for a Disney film since "Chim Chim Cher-ee" from Mary Poppins in 1964. Additionally, the song won the Grammy Award for Best Song Written for Visual Media in 1991. 

The song is a plea by the crab Sebastian imploring Ariel to remain sea-bound, and resist her desire to become a human in order to spend her life with Prince Eric, with whom she has fallen in love. Sebastian warns of the struggles of human life, while at the same time expounding the benefits of a care-free life underwater. However, his plea falls on deaf ears, as Ariel leaves before the end of the song.

The song is present throughout all the Walt Disney parks and resorts and the Disney Cruise Line.

Single release

The song was released as a 12" single in 1990 by Walt Disney Pictures / Hollywood Records. The record listed the artist as "Sebastian C."

'US 12-inch single (ST-ED-66621A-SP)
 "Under the Sea (Atlantic Ocean Single Mix)" - 3:36
 "Under the Sea (Jellyfish Mix)" - 5:20
 "Under the Sea (Mermaid Dub)" - 3:27
 "Under the Sea (Pacific Ocean Single Mix)" - 3:10
 "Under the Sea (Polka Dot Bikini Mix)" - 5:33
 "Under the Sea (Sub Dub)" - 3:46

Certifications

Live and stage versions
The song makes an appearance on the Disney Cruise Line shows "Disney Dreams: An Enchanted Classic" on the Disney Magic and Wonder, as well as in "The Golden Mickeys" on the Disney Dream.

In 2007, the Broadway musical version used this as the featured production number, with the role of Sebastian played by Tituss Burgess. For Burgess, a tenor (unlike the baritone Wright), the key of the song was raised from B-flat to D. In the Original Broadway Cast, the placing of the song was also moved to after the scene in which King Triton destroys Ariel's collection of "human stuff". Later in some local productions after the Broadway production closed, the placing of the song is the same as it was in the original film. The key was lowered slightly to the key of C (in which Ashman and Menken recorded their initial demos for The Little Mermaid).

Cover versions

 In 1995, Alvin and the Chipmunks covered the song in their album, When You Wish Upon a Chipmunk. However, The Walt Disney Company neither sponsored nor endorsed the album.
 Mannheim Steamroller covered the song on their 1999 album Mannheim Steamroller Meets the Mouse.
 In 2002, the song was featured in the Square Enix action RPG Kingdom Hearts as the background music for the Atlantica world. In 2005, the song also appeared in Kingdom Hearts II as part of a minigame where it was rearranged to have parts for Sebastian, Ariel, and Sora. For both appearances, the music was arranged by Yoko Shimomura.
 It is often performed by Suburban Legends during their live performances. The band performed frequently at Downtown Disney at the Disneyland Resort in their early years, and still often play at Disneyland's Tomorrowland Terrace. The song appears on their 2012 album Day Job.
 The song is also covered by the A*Teens for DisneyMania, by Raven-Symoné for DisneyMania 3 and later by Booboo Stewart for DisneyMania 7. A remix of Raven's version is also featured on DisneyRemixMania.
 The song is covered by the band Squirrel Nut Zippers on their album The Best of Squirrel Nut Zippers as Chronicled by Shorty Brown.
 The Brazilian singer Diogo Nogueira made a Portuguese version of the song ("Aqui no Mar", meaning something like, "Here at Sea") in a samba style on the album Disney Adventures in Samba.
 In 2005, Taiwanese singer Jolin Tsai recorded the Chinese version of the song to celebrate the grand opening of Hong Kong Disneyland.
 In 2007, a Korean version sung by SM Entertainment artists The Grace, Super Junior, and Zhang Liyin was released. It was later re-recorded in 2015 by the agency's trainee team SM Rookies for the Korean Mickey Mouse Show and the SM Rookies Show.
 In the 2012 album Disney - Koe no Oujisama, which features various Japanese voice actors covering Disney songs. This song was covered by Miyu Irino, who previously covered the song in Kingdom Hearts II as Sora's Japanese voice.
 In 2013, Alex Day covered the song for his album Epigrams and Interludes.
 In 2017, D-Metal Stars created a Heavy Metal cover of the song on the album "Metal Disney" featuring Mike Vescera and Rudy Sarzo
 The track is also covered for the video game Just Dance 2016.
 In 2017, The Ocean Cure covered the song for the compilation album "Hardcore Goes Disney".
 In 2019, the Swedish/Chilean artist DJ Méndez covered the song in Spanish for the Swedish compilation album "We Love Disney".
 In 2020, reggae musician Shaggy covered the song on his Hot Shot 2020 album.
 Samples the song "Rhythm of the Night." - De Barge

Reprise

A reprise of the song was featured in the Broadway musical.

Parodies

In 1991, this song was parodied by musician Tom Smith with his song, "On The PC". This song was re-written in 1999 as "PC99".

The song was parodied on the TV show Kappa Mikey where Mikey tries to convince a squid to live on land with him.

The song was parodied on the TV show Bobby's World as "Underwater the Fish Don't Stink".  The context was a dream of Bobby's in which he was a fish and his Uncle Ted was a merman - it turned out Bobby was having the dream because he was sleeping outside and the lawn sprinklers had turned on.

The song was also briefly parodied in the Tiny Toons movie How I Spent My Vacation.

The song was parodied on the TV show The Simpsons in the episode "Homer Badman," in a sequence where Homer Simpson imagines living under water (eating all of the characters from The Little Mermaid) to escape the protesters and media circus who have accused him of sexually harassing a college coed.

The song in part inspired the song "That's How You Know" from Enchanted, which also had music by Menken. 

On a 2011 episode of Saturday Night Live hosted by Tina Fey, a mermaid princess (Fey) sings another version called "Below the Waves" with her sea-animal friends: a crab resembling Sebastian (Kenan Thompson), two salmon (Abby Elliott and Vanessa Bayer), a seahorse (Paul Brittain) and a manta ray (Fred Armisen). The song is interrupted by the arrival of Osama Bin Laden's body.

In 2014, College Humor created a parody "Deep under the sea, fish are ugly" discussing strange creatures of the deep sea.

The song, as well as a majority of other factors in the film, was parodied in an episode of The Grim Adventures of Billy & Mandy'' in which Billy's character goes swimming and encounters a small yellow crab (voiced by Steven Blum) who sings a song for him entitled "Under the Ocean" in a style reminiscent of the scene of Sebastian singing the song for Ariel.

References

External links
  (on Disney's official channel)

Songs about fish
Songs about oceans and seas
1989 singles
1989 songs
Songs from The Little Mermaid (franchise)
Best Original Song Golden Globe winning songs
Best Original Song Academy Award-winning songs
Grammy Award for Best Song Written for Visual Media
Calypso songs
Disney Renaissance songs
Reggae songs
Songs with music by Alan Menken
Songs with lyrics by Howard Ashman
Kingdom Hearts songs
Walt Disney Records singles
Song recordings produced by Alan Menken
Song recordings produced by Howard Ashman